John Chest (born July 6, 1985) is an American baritone opera singer performing with leading opera companies around the world.

Career
John Chest was born in Greenville, South Carolina, to parents Sandra Marie Chest and Robert Davis Chest. He started his professional voice studies at Bob Jones University where he got his Bachelor of Music in Voice Performance from 2003 to 2007. He then studied at CCPA (Chicago College of Performing Arts) at Roosevelt University, where he graduated with a Master of Music (Voice Performance) in 2009 after two years. Following that he joined the Apprentice Program at Santa Fe Opera for the summer of 2008 where he covered the Bosun in Benjamin Britten's Billy Budd (an introduction to the opera that he is known for playing the title role in today.) Chest joined the Merola Opera Program at the San Francisco Opera in the summer of 2009 where he performed Guglielmo in Così fan tutte. He concluded his formal studies in the professional  at the Bavarian State Opera from 2009 to 2011 where he sang in over 80 performances.

Best further trained with the Chicago Opera Theater and he was a member of the ensemble at Deutsche Oper Berlin until 2016. His roles in Berlin included the title role of Billy Budd in a new production by David Alden; Valentin (Faust), Ford (Falstaff), Silvio (Pagliacci), Figaro (Il barbiere di Siviglia), Papageno (Die Zauberflöte), Gugliemo (Così fan tutte) and Il Conte Almaviva (Le nozze di Figaro).

A finalist in the BBC Singer of the World Art Song Competition, he has also appeared in recital at the Aix-en-Provence Festival, the Philharmonie de Paris, and Wigmore Hall. He has made appearances on three Fauré CD's with pianist Malcolm Martineau.

Repertory

References

External links 
 

American operatic baritones
Living people
1985 births
21st-century American opera singers
21st-century American male singers
21st-century American singers